Bis(acetonitrile)palladium dichloride is the coordination complex with the formula PdCl2(NCCH3)2.  It is the adduct of two acetonitrile ligands with palladium(II) chloride.  It is a yellow-brown solid that is soluble in organic solvents.  The compound is a reagent and a catalyst for reactions that require soluble Pd(II).  The compound is similar to bis(benzonitrile)palladium dichloride.  It reacts with 1,5-cyclooctadiene to give dichloro(1,5‐cyclooctadiene)palladium.

References

Palladium compounds
Homogeneous catalysis
Coordination complexes
Chloro complexes
Nitriles